An Artist in Life is a biography of Rabindranath Tagore first published in 1967 by the University of Kerala. The book, written by Niharranjan Ray took 15 years to research and publish. The biography also presents a critical study of all Tagore's works.

It almost took 15 years of planning for the author to come up with the first draft of the book that was published in University of Kerala in 1967.

The book won the Sahitya Akademi Award in 1969.

References

Bibliography

Indian biographies
1967 non-fiction books
20th-century Indian books
Sahitya Akademi Award-winning works